is a Japanese gymnast. She competed in six events at the 1984 Summer Olympics.

References

1967 births
Living people
Japanese female artistic gymnasts
Olympic gymnasts of Japan
Gymnasts at the 1984 Summer Olympics
Place of birth missing (living people)
Asian Games medalists in gymnastics
Gymnasts at the 1986 Asian Games
Asian Games bronze medalists for Japan
Medalists at the 1986 Asian Games
20th-century Japanese women